Thomas O'Doherty (21 November 1877 – 15 December 1936) was Bishop of Clonfert and Bishop of Galway successively from November 1919 to July 1936.

Early life and education

O'Doherty was born at Loughglynn, Ballaghaderreen, County Roscommon on 21 November 1877 and educated in Sligo and Maynooth.

He was ordained priest on 22 June 1902 for service in the Diocese of Elphin and his first pastoral appointment was to the staff of Summerhill College, Sligo, from 1902–1910. He was then appointed to the staff of Maynooth College where he served as a Dean for nearly a decade before he was appointed Bishop of Clonfert on 3 July 1919.

Episcopal Ministry

Clonfert
He served in the East Galway diocese for three years before he was moved to the larger diocese of Galway. These early years as a bishop coincided with the turbulent events of the Anglo-Irish war and the Civil War. O'Doherty has been assessed by historians as pro-Treaty bishop but more measured in his tone than his episcopal colleagues in other parts of Galway.

Galway
In July 1923 he was moved to Galway succeeding the man he had succeeded as Bishop in Clonfert, Thomas O'Dea. He is remembered as a "disciplinarian" which would be consistent with his previous posting in Maynooth responsible for the formation of students.

In July 1935, along with many other Irish bishops he opined on the evils of the dance-halls which were "practically on all occasions dangerous to morals." He used the same occasion to denounce "the evils of mixed bathing."

He died at his residence aged 59 in Galway on 15 December 1936 and is buried in the crypt of the new Cathedral.

References

 Lickmolassy by the Shannon, p. 201, John Joe Conwell, 1998, .

External links
 

People from County Roscommon
People from County Galway
Alumni of St Patrick's College, Maynooth
Roman Catholic bishops of Clonfert
Roman Catholic bishops of Galway, Kilmacduagh and Kilfenora
1877 births
1936 deaths